Gymnetina is a genus of fruit and flower chafers in the family of beetles known as Scarabaeidae. There are about six described species in Gymnetina.

Species
These six species belong to the genus Gymnetina:
 Gymnetina alboscripta (Janson, 1878) c g
 Gymnetina borealis Ratcliffe & Warner, 2011 c g b
 Gymnetina cretacea (LeConte, 1866) i c g b
 Gymnetina grossepunctata Ratcliffe & Warner, 2011 c g
 Gymnetina howdeni Ratcliffe & Warner, 2011 c g b
 Gymnetina salicis (Bates, 1889) c g
Data sources: i = ITIS, c = Catalogue of Life, g = GBIF, b = Bugguide.net

References

Further reading

External links

 

Cetoniinae